Rosin  is a village in the administrative district of Gmina Świebodzin, within Świebodzin County, Lubusz Voivodeship, in western Poland. The estimated population of Rosin, Poland is 281.

References

Rosin